is a Japanese model and J-pop idol singer.  She was born in Asahikawa, Hokkaido, Japan (raised in Eniwa, Hokkaido), and made her singing debut on January 10, 1996. She has a sister Mika who is also a model, under the stage name Mika Kawai. Her husband is Nobuhiko Sanrindo.

Discography

Singles 
 21 August 1996 SHYABON Dama   
 21 November 1996 SURIRU

Albums 
 21 September 1996 Variety Kids

Filmography

Television
Bengoshi no Kuzu (2006)

Film
Beautiful Lure (2021)

Picture books 
 PYU
 Final Beauty Yabe Miho
 Loose

References

1977 births
Living people
Japanese actresses
Japanese gravure idols
Japanese television personalities
Musicians from Hokkaido
People from Asahikawa
People from Eniwa, Hokkaido